The Zenn Valley Railway is a branch line in the German free state of Bavaria that branches at Siegelsdorf off the Nuremberg–Würzburg railway and runs to Markt Erlbach. It is single-tracked, with a crossing loop in Wilhermsdorf station, and non-electrified. All trains run from and to Fürth Hauptbahnhof. The Zenn Valley Railway was the first Vizinalbahn ("neighbourhood railway") in Bavaria and was especially important to the town of Langenzenn due to the brickworks there. The line opened in stages between 1872 and 1902.

References

External links
Route description at Nahverkehr Franken (private)

Buildings and structures in Ansbach (district)
Buildings and structures in Fürth (district)
Branch lines in Bavaria
Railway lines opened in 1872
1872 establishments in Germany
Buildings and structures in Neustadt (Aisch)-Bad Windsheim